Cape Sounion (Modern Greek: Aκρωτήριο Σούνιο Akrotírio Soúnio ;  Άkron Soúnion, latinized Sunium; Venetian: Capo Colonne "Cape of Columns") is the  promontory at the southernmost tip of the Attic peninsula,  south of the town of Lavrio (ancient Thoricus), and 69.5 km (43.1 miles) southeast of Athens. It is part of Lavreotiki municipality, East Attica, Greece. 

Cape Sounion is noted for its Temple of Poseidon, one of the major monuments of the Golden Age of Athens. Its remains are perched on the headland, surrounded on three sides by the Aegean sea.

Climate

Cape Sounio has a hot semi-arid climate (Köppen climate classification: BSh). Cape Sounio experiences hot, dry summers and mild, wetter winters.

History

The earliest literary reference to Sounion is in Homer's  Odyssey (III. 278–285). The story recounts that as the various Greek commanders sailed back from Troy, the helmsman of the ship of King Menelaus of Sparta died at his post while rounding "Holy Sounion, Cape of Athens." Menelaus landed at Sounion to give his companion full funeral honours (i.e., cremation on a funeral pyre on the beach).

Archaeological finds on the site date from as early as 700 BC. Herodotus (VI.87) mentions that in sixth century BC, the Athenians celebrated a quinquennial festival at Sounion, which involved Athens' leaders sailing to the cape in a sacred boat.

Deme

Sounion was a deme of the Leontis tribe (phyle) even before its fortification in the Peloponnesian War. It sent four men to the ancient Boule of 500 at the time of Cleisthenes, and later (3rd century BC) six men to the Boule of 600. In the 2nd century BC, Sounion is still on record as a deme, but now considered part of the recently-introduced Attalid phyle (created in honour of Attalus I).

The deme was located between Amphitrope to the west and Thorikos to the north. Its territory included parts of the Mines of Laurion. According to Traill (1986), the center of the settlement was situated somewhat to the north of the cape, between the modern settlements of Ano Sounio and Kato Sounio (close to ).

Sounion was fortified in the nineteenth year of the Peloponnesian War (413 BCE) for the purpose of protecting the passage of the cornships to Athens, and was regarded from that time as one of the principal fortresses of Attica. Its proximity to the silver mines of Laurium probably contributed to its prosperity, which passed into a proverb; but even in the time of Cicero it had sunk into decay. The circuit of the walls may still be traced, except where the precipitous nature of the rocks afforded a natural defence. The walls which are fortified with square towers, are of the most regular Hellenic masonry, and enclose a space or a little more than half a mile in circumference. The southern part of Attica, extending northwards from the promontory of Sounion as far as Thoricus on the east, and Anaphlystus on the west, is called by Herodotus the Suniac angle (τὸν γουνὸν τὸν Σουνιακόν). Though Sounion was especially sacred to Athena, we learn from Aristophanes that Poseidon was also worshipped there.

Temple of Poseidon

The original, Archaic-period temple of Poseidon on the site  was built of tufa. The Sounion Kouros, discovered in 1906 in a pit east of the temple alongside fragments of other statues, was probably one of a number of votive statues dedicated to Poseidon which probably stood in front of the god's sanctuary. The archaic temple was probably destroyed in 480 BC by Persian troops during Xerxes I's invasion of Greece. After they defeated Xerxes in the naval Battle of Salamis, the Athenians placed an entire captured enemy trireme (warship with three banks of oars) at Sounion as a trophy dedicated to Poseidon.

The temple of Poseidon at Sounion was constructed in 444–440 BC.  This was during the ascendancy of the Athenian statesman Pericles, who also rebuilt the Parthenon in Athens. It was built on the ruins of a temple dating from the Archaic period.  It is perched above the sea at a height of almost . The design of the temple is a typical hexastyle, i.e., it had a front portico with six columns. Only some columns of the Sounion temple stand today, but when intact it would have closely resembled the contemporary and well-preserved Temple of Hephaestus beneath the Acropolis, which may have been designed by the same architect.

As with all Greek temples, the Poseidon building was rectangular, with a colonnade on all four sides. The total number of original columns was 34, of which 15 still stand today. The columns are of the Doric Order. They were made of locally quarried white marble. They were 6.10 m (20 ft) high, with a diameter of 1 m (3.1 ft) at the base and 79 cm (31 inches) at the top.

Fortress

In 413 BC, during the Peloponnesian War against the Spartans, the Athenians fortified the site with a wall and towers to prevent it from falling into Spartan hands. This would have threatened Athens' seaborne grain supply route from Euboea. Athens' supply situation had become critical since the city's land supply lines had been cut by the Spartan fortification of Dekeleia, to the north of Attica. The Sounion fortress was soon later seized from the Athenians by a force of rebel slaves from the nearby silver mines of Laurium.

The Temple of Poseidon was situated in the southeastern corner of the fortress, with the garrison quarters arranged along a main stream on the western slope of the hill. The fortress included a small naval base, with a shipshed for two warships in the northwestern corner. The fortress was maintained well into the Hellenistic period. Repairs and additions to the fortress were made during the Chremonidean War (266–261 BC).

Literary reception

The name Capo Colonne (graecicized  Kavokolones) is reported from the 17th century, for the reason that unusually, several columns of the temple of Poseidon had remained standing since antiquity. Early modern descriptions in travelogues include those by G. Wheler (1676), J.-D. Le Roy (1754), R. Chandler (1765) and E. Dodwell (1805). Scottish poet William Falconer (1732-1769) was shipwrecked off Cape Colonna, as Sounion was then known, in 1750, an event depicted in the central scene of his The Shipwreck (1762).

The inscribed name of George Lord Byron, carved into the base of one of the columns of the Temple of Poseidon, possibly dates from his first visit to Greece, on his Grand Tour of Europe before he acquired fame. Byron spent several months in 1810–11 in Athens, including two documented visits to Sounion. There is, however, no direct evidence that the inscription was made by Byron himself. Byron mentions Sounion in his poem Isles of Greece:

Place me on Sunium's marbled steep,
Where nothing, save the waves and I,
May hear our mutual murmurs sweep...

Martin Heidegger visited Sounion during his journey to Greece in 1962, as described in his book Sojourns. He refers to the "gleaming-white ruins of the temple". In the strong sea breeze "these few standing columns were the strings of an invisible lyre, the song of which the far-seeing Delian god let resonate over the Cycladic world of islands". He marvels at "the way that this single gesture of the land suggests the invisible nearness of the divine and dedicates to it every growth and every human work" (ibid.). He goes on to reflect "the people of this country knew how to inhabit and demarcate the world against the barbarous in honour of the seat of the gods. ...they knew how to praise what is great and by acknowledging it, to bring themselves in front of the sublime, founding, in this way, a world" (ibid.).

Modern development

Cape Sounion remains a popular day-excursion for tourists from Athens, with the sunset over the Aegean Sea, as viewed from the ruins, a sought-after sight since the first development of modern tourism in the early 19th century.

The Lavreotiki municipality was established in 1890 under the name of Sounio, and renamed to Lavreotiki in 1891. Cape Sounion itself is located between the villages of Kato Sounio and Legrena.

The Sounio national park (Εθνικός Δρυμός τού Σουνίου) was established in 1974 with a core area of 750 hectares.

Forming the southeastern endpoint of the Athens Riviera, Sounion is now an upscale summer home location for Athenians. Construction of villas across the bay northwest of Cape Sounion flourished in the 1960s to 1970s. The Grecotel Cape Sounio luxury resort was built in 1973.

The project Arrangement of the Archaeological Site of Sounion (2011–2013) was co-financed by the Greek Ministry of Culture and Sports and the European Union (ERDF).

Notes

"Sounion" in: Stillwell (ed.), The Princeton Encyclopedia of Classical Sites (2017), p. 854.

External links

 360 Panorama from Temple of Poseidon
 Sounion 3D

Ancient Attica
Ancient Greek archaeological sites in Greece
Archaeological sites in Attica
Headlands of Greece
Landforms of East Attica
Locations in the Iliad